This is a list of the heads of government of the modern Bulgarian state, from the establishment of the Principality of Bulgaria to the present day.

List of officeholders

Principality of Bulgaria (1878–1908)

Kingdom of Bulgaria (1908–1946)

People's Republic of Bulgaria (1946–1990)

Republic of Bulgaria (1990–present)

Timeline

Principality of Bulgaria

Kingdom of Bulgaria

People's Republic of Bulgaria

Republic of Bulgaria

Footnotes

References

See also
Government of Bulgaria
History of Bulgaria
Politics of Bulgaria
List of Bulgarian monarchs
President of Bulgaria
List of heads of state of Bulgaria
List of presidents of Bulgaria (1990-present)
Prime Minister of Bulgaria

Bulgaria
List
Prime Ministers of Bulgaria
Prime ministers